Alba Vázquez Ruiz (born 24 February 2002) is a Spanish swimmer. She won the bronze medal in the 400 metre individual medley at the 2022 Mediterranean Games. At the 2019 European Junior Championships she won a gold medal in the 400 metre individual medley. She won the gold medal in the 400 metre individual medley and the silver medal in the 200 metre individual medley at the 2019 World Junior Championships. She is a former world junior record holder in the 400 metre individual medley.

Early life
Vázquez was born 24 February 2002 in Spain.

Career

2018–2021

2018 Swimming World Cup: Doha

At the 2018 FINA Swimming World Cup stop held at the Hamad Aquatic Centre in Doha, Qatar, Vázquez won her first medal in the 200 metre breaststroke where she posted a time of 2:30.33 to finish 6.78 seconds behind the gold medalist in the event, Yuliya Yefimova of Russia, 6.27 seconds behind the silver medalist, Vitalina Simonova of Russia, and win the bronze medal. In the 400 metre individual medley, Vázquez won another bronze medal, finishing only after Katinka Hosszú of Hungary and Zsuzsanna Jakabos of Hungary with her time of 4:48.68.

2019 European Junior Championships

In July 2019, at the 2019 European Junior Swimming Championships held at the Palace of Water Sports in Kazan, Russia, Vázquez set a new Championships record in the 400 metre individual medley with her gold medal-winning time of 4:40.64, breaking the former record of 4:40.88 set in 2009 by Gráinne Murphy of Ireland.

2019 World Junior Championships

On the first day of competition, 20 August, of the 2019 World Junior Championships at Danube Arena in Budapest, Hungary, Vázquez advanced to the final of the 400 metre individual medley with a time of 4:43.17 that ranked her first overall. In the final of the 400 metre individual medley later the same day, Vázquez won the gold medal in the event with a world junior record and Championships record time of 4:38.53, breaking the former records set by Rosie Rudin of Great Britain in 2015. Her world junior record was the first one set at the 2019 World Junior Championships. With her swim, Vázquez also became the second fastest female Spaniard in the event in history only behind Mireia Belmonte. On 23 August, Vázquez ranked seventh in the prelims heats of the 200 metre individual medley, swimming a time of 2:15.82 and qualifying for the final. Later in the day, Vázquez swam a personal best time of 2:13.43 in the final, winning the silver medal in the event. The two medals Vázquez won, one gold medal and one silver medal, were the only medals won by swimmers representing Spain at the year's World Junior Championships.

Vázquez's accomplishments at the European Junior Championships and the World Junior Championships, caught the attention of Diario AS who gave her their "Prospect Award" for being the most promising newcomer athlete in Spain for the 2019 year.

2020 European Aquatics Championships
At the 2020 European Aquatics Championships in Budapest, Hungary in May, Vázquez placed eleventh in her first event, the 400 metre individual medley, with a time of 4:45.26. In her second and final event, the 200 metre individual medley, she swam a 2:15.36 in the preliminary heats, placing 23rd overall.

2022
In April 2022, Vázquez was named to a preliminary roster for Spain for the 2022 European Aquatics Championships in the 200 metre individual medley and 400 metre individual medley events. She was also named to the 2022 Mediterranean Games roster for the same events.

2022 Mediterranean Games

The first day of swimming competition at the 2022 Mediterranean Games, 1 July in Oran, Algeria, Vázquez qualified for the final of the 400 metre individual medley later in the day. In the final, she finished behind Sara Franceschi of Italy and Deniz Ertan of Turkey to win the bronze medal with a time of 4:45.53. Three days later, she ranked seventh in the preliminaries of the 200 metre individual medley, qualifying for the final with a time of 2:20.44. She placed fifth in the final with a time of 2:16.50. The final day of swimming competition, she ranked sixth in the preliminaries of the 200 metre breaststroke with a time of 2:34.47 and advanced to the evening final. With a time of 2:31.28 in the final, she placed sixth.

2022 European Aquatics Championships
In early August, Vázquez was officially confirmed to compete for Spain at the 2022 European Aquatics Championships. She started off with a 4:46.72 in the preliminaries of the 400 metre individual medley on day three, qualifying for the final ranking seventh across all prelims heats, which ranked sixth out of the final qualifiers. She placed fifth in the final with a time of 4:42.40, finishing 2.34 seconds behind bronze medalist Freya Colbert of Great Britain. Two days later, in the preliminaries of the 200 metre individual medley, she ranked sixteenth with a time of 2:16.99 and qualified for the semifinals. She placed eleventh in the semifinals, finishing eighth in semifinal heat one with a time of 2:15.27.

2022 Swimming World Cup
During the three days of competition at the 2022 FINA Swimming World Cup stop held in October in Berlin, Germany, Vázquez competed in six individual events, placing twenty-fourth in the 200 metre breaststroke with a 2:30.19, twenty-sixth in the 200m individual medley with a 2:16.86, thirty-fourth in the 200 metre backstroke with a 2:19.66, forth-ninth in the 100 metre breaststroke with a 1:11.12, forty-ninth in the 200 metre freestyle with a 2:03.43, and fifty-first in the 100m individual medley with a 1:05.60.

2023
At the 2023 Flanders Cup, held in January in Antwerp, Belgium, Vázquez won two medals, the first was a silver medal in the 200 metre breaststroke with a 2:34.42 and the second was a bronze medal in the 200 metre individual medley with a time of 2:18.98, which was 5.45 seconds behind gold medalist Marrit Steenbergen of the Netherlands.

International championships

Personal best times

Long course metres (50 m pool)

Legend: WJ – World Junior record

Short course metres (25 m pool)

World records

World junior records

Long course metres (50 m pool)

Awards and honours
 Diario AS, Prospect Award: 2019

References

External links
 

2002 births
Living people
Spanish female breaststroke swimmers
Spanish female medley swimmers
Mediterranean Games medalists in swimming
Mediterranean Games bronze medalists for Spain
21st-century Spanish women
Swimmers at the 2022 Mediterranean Games